Nashville Superspeedway is a motor racing complex located in Gladeville, Tennessee, United States (though the track has a Lebanon postal address), about  southeast of Nashville. The track was built in 2001 and is currently hosting the Ally 400, a NASCAR Cup Series regular season event, the Tennessee Lottery 250, and the Rackley Roofing 200.

It is a concrete oval track 1 miles (2.145 km) long. Nashville Superspeedway is owned by Speedway Motorsports, which acquired the track’s previous owner Dover Motorsports in December 2021. Nashville Superspeedway is the longest concrete oval in NASCAR. Current permanent seating capacity is approximately 25,000, but will reach up to 38,000 for the NASCAR Cup Series event in 2021. Additional portable seats are brought in for some events, and seating capacity can be expanded to 150,000. When the track was constructed infrastructure was put in place to expand the facility to include a short track, drag strip, and road course. However these plans never evolved and in 2021 the land was sold and warehouses were constructed on the site.

History
At its peak, the facility hosted four major races each year: two NASCAR Xfinity Series races and two NASCAR Camping World Truck Series races (one per year prior to 2010). The IndyCar Series Firestone Indy 200 was run at the track from its opening until 2008. Each feature event was usually accompanied by a companion event from lower-tier series such as ARCA and Indy Lights. NASCAR continually showed little interest in staging a NASCAR Cup Series race at the track.

In October 2009, Dover Motorsports decided to close Memphis Motorsports Park, and the Memphis Truck race originally scheduled for late June 2010 was moved to Nashville Superspeedway on April 2, one day prior to the annual Nationwide Series race at the track.  The April Truck race was known as the "Nashville 200". Nashville Superspeedway became the only facility on the circuit to host two Truck Series races without hosting a NASCAR Cup event.

As is a Nashville metropolitan tradition, specially-designed Gibson Les Paul guitars are presented to race winners in place of conventional trophies. The track also has a reputation for producing many first-time winners.

The track is referred by the classic term of a "superspeedway" (a track of one mile (1.6 km) or longer, compared to a short track), and is named to differentiate itself from the .596 mile Fairgrounds Speedway (previously known as Nashville Speedway USA) at the Tennessee State Fairgrounds near downtown Nashville. Until 1984, Nashville Speedway USA had conducted a pair of 420-lap Cup races, but NASCAR pulled its sanctioning license from the circuit after disputes over who would manage the track took place prior to the start of the 1985 season.

Closure
Following sluggish attendance for major events and no prospects of gaining a Cup Series event, Dover Motorsports announced that the track would not seek NASCAR sanctions in 2012, effectively shutting it down, on August 3, 2011. In the announcement, Dover also hinted that the track was up for sale. The track remained available for private use, such as car and tire testing.

The track also remained available, and has been used, as a filming location for various television and film projects. From 2012 to 2014, Nashville Superspeedway was used for testing by NASCAR teams before NASCAR banned all private tests in 2015.

Attempted sale
On May 29, 2014, it was announced that NeXovation, Inc. would be purchasing the racetrack and all assets and equipment from Dover Motorsports for $27 million. However, the deal never materialized and Dover Motorsports reopened the sale of the track on July 28, 2015. NeXovation had invested $2.9 million (mostly nonrefundable) into the track, mostly in deadline extensions, and Dover pulled out of the sale after another deadline was missed and no payment was received. The deal with NeXovation was ultimately canceled, though the company lost approximately $2.9 million in earnest money.

On August 25, 2016, Dover announced it had reached an agreement to sell the property to Panattoni Development Company in a $44.7 million deal. Panattoni planned to convert the site into a distribution and logistics park, the primary usage of commercial real estate in the area. In 2018 the deal was reduced to a  portion of the property only, with another  being sold in 2019; Panattoni also held an option on an additional  to be exercised before 2022.

Reopening and sale
On June 2, 2020, reports began to surface that Nashville Superspeedway would reopen in 2021 and would host a NASCAR Cup Series race, with a date of Sunday, June 20. The race replaced one of the two races the series ran at Dover International Speedway, which was also owned by Dover Motorsports. On June 3, NASCAR confirmed that the track will reopen to host a Cup race in 2021, replacing one of the two Dover dates. The track brought on sports management executive Erik Moses as track president in August 2020 ahead of the reopening. The race was announced as the Ally 400. On March 23, 2021, Goodyear hosted a tire test at the track. Each manufacturer was represented, with Christopher Bell (Toyota), Chase Briscoe (Ford), and Kurt Busch (Chevrolet) turning laps around the track. The inaugural Ally 400 was won by Kyle Larson.

On November 8, 2021, Speedway Motorsports agreed to purchase Dover Motorsports for $3.61 per share in cash for an approximate total equity value of $131.5 million. The close of the deal was subject to certain conditions and was completed and closed by December 22, 2021.

Records
 NASCAR Cup Series Qualifying: Aric Almirola, 29.557 sec. (161.992 mph), June 20, 2021
 NASCAR Cup Series Race: Kyle Larson, 3 hrs. 30 min. 23 sec. (113.792 mph), June 20, 2021
 NASCAR Xfinity Series Qualifying: David Stremme, 28.811 sec. (166.561 mph), June 2007
 NASCAR Xfinity Series Race: 
 300 miles (2001–2011): Scott Wimmer, 2 hrs. 14 min. 12 sec. (134.095 mph), March 22, 2008
 250 miles (2021–): Justin Allgaier, 2 hrs. 5 min. 44 sec. (119.319 mph), June 25, 2022
 NASCAR Truck Series Qualifying: Erik Darnell, 29.601 sec. (162.116 mph), 2006
 NASCAR Truck Series Race: Kyle Busch, 1 hr. 27 min. 55 sec. (136.459 mph), April 2, 2010
 Indycar Qualifying: Scott Dixon, 23.271 sec. (206.211 mph / 331.864 km/h), July 18, 2003
 Indycar Race: Buddy Lazier, 144.809 mph (233.047 km/h), July 21, 2001

Feature race winners

NASCAR Cup Series

NASCAR Xfinity Series

2005: Race postponed from Saturday to Sunday due to rain.

NASCAR Truck Series

IndyCar Series

2007: Race postponed from Saturday night to Sunday afternoon due to rain.
2008: Race shortened to 171 laps due to rain.

See also
 List of NASCAR tracks

References

External links
Nashville Superspeedway Official Site

Motorsport venues in Tennessee
NASCAR tracks
Sports venues in Nashville, Tennessee
ARCA Menards Series tracks
IndyCar Series tracks
Buildings and structures in Wilson County, Tennessee
2001 establishments in Tennessee
Sports venues completed in 2001